Andrew "Yogi" McKay is a retired Scottish-American association football (soccer) player who played professionally in the United States.

McKay graduated from Arcadia High School in Greece, New York.   He attended Catawba College, playing on the school's soccer team in 1983, 1985 and 1986.  He holds  numerous school records including goals scored in a game, all time season and career assists leader.  McKay played for Greece Soccer Club Rangers and Team Lapine, both are amateur teams.  In 1990, he turned professional with the Orlando Lions of the American Professional Soccer League.  When the Lions merged with the Fort Lauderdale Strikers in 1991, McKay was the only Lions player to remain with the team for the 1991 season.  In 1994, McKay moved indoors with the Buffalo Blizzard of the National Professional Soccer League.  From 1996 to 1998, he played for the Rochester Rhinos in the USISL A-League. In 2000, he signed with St. Catharines Wolves of the Canadian Professional Soccer League. In the 2001 season he won the CPSL Championship by defeating Toronto Supra by a score of 1-0.

References

Living people
American soccer players
American Professional Soccer League players
Buffalo Blizzard players
Fort Lauderdale Strikers (1988–1994) players
National Professional Soccer League (1984–2001) players
Orlando Lions players
Rochester New York FC players
USISL players
People from Greece, New York
St. Catharines Roma Wolves players
Canadian Soccer League (1998–present) players
Association football forwards
Association football midfielders
Year of birth missing (living people)